Francis "Frank" J. Zitterman (February 1, 1932 – April 26, 1993) was a Democratic member of the Pennsylvania House of Representatives.
 He was born in Dickson City.

References

1932 births
1993 deaths
People from Dickson City, Pennsylvania
Democratic Party members of the Pennsylvania House of Representatives
20th-century American politicians